Mosheim is an unincorporated community in Bosque County in Central Texas, USA. It has a population of around 50.

Overview 

The town was settled in the 1850s by Jonathan Dansby. Jeff Howard built the first store in 1886 and it was then called Mosheim. The post office was closed in 1976.

In the mid-1900s, the town had around 200 people, with the population dropping to 75 in the late 1960s.

References 

Unincorporated communities in Bosque County, Texas
Unincorporated communities in Texas